Stephen V. "Steve" Shepich (October 12, 1948 – October 24, 2013) was a Democratic member of the Michigan House of Representatives.

He was the head of the Michigan House Fiscal Agency at the start of 1993. He and several of his associates were prosecuted for fraudulent activity. He plea bargained to charges of fraudulent travel reimbursement while on the staff of the Michigan House Fiscal Agency, resigning his seat as part of the deal. He was succeeded by fellow Democrat Paul Tesanovich.

He died October 24, 2013.

References

Democratic Party members of the Michigan House of Representatives
1948 births
2013 deaths
People from Iron River, Michigan
Michigan State University alumni
Northern Michigan University alumni
Michigan politicians convicted of crimes
20th-century American politicians